Guava jelly may refer to:
 Goiabada
 Bocadillo
 Guava Jelly (song)